DeSimone or De Simone is an Italian surname. Notable people with the surname include:

DeSimone family
A group of related Italian American mobsters:
Frank DeSimone, lawyer turned mobster
Rosario DeSimone, early Los Angeles mobster
Thomas DeSimone

Other people: DeSimone
Bob DeSimone (born 1946), American actor
Herbert F. DeSimone (1929–2013), American  lawyer and politician from Rhode Island
James DeSimone (G.I. Joe)
Joée, born Joey DeSimone
Joseph DeSimone (inventor)
Louis A. DeSimone (1922–2018), American Roman Catholic bishop
Paul DeSimone, American bodybuilder
Robert Desimone, American neuroscientist
Tom DeSimone (born 1939), American film director
Vincent DeSimone (1918–1979), New Jersey detective

De Simone
Carlo De Simone (1885 – 1951), Italian army officer in World War II
Carlo De Simone (linguist) (born 1932), Italian linguist
Domenico de Simone (1768-1837), Italian cardinal
Domenico De Simone (1926 – 2019), Italian politician
Fabrizio De Simone (born 1971), Italian racing driver
Giovanni Alfredo De Simone (1919-1985, known as Johnny Desmond), American singer
Gustavo de Simone (born 1948), Uruguayan footballer
Lenika de Simone (born 1985), Spanish gymnast
Niccolò De Simone (died c. 1677), Flemish painter
Titti De Simone (born 1970), Italian politician